Ghebreyesus may refer to:

Fisihasion Ghebreyesus (born 1941), Ethiopian cyclist
Tedros Adhanom Ghebreyesus (born 1965), Ethiopian politician and Director-General of the World Health Organization